Robert C. "Bob" Pechous (August 24, 1933 – July 9, 2013) was an American politician and educator.

Early life 
Born in Berwyn, Illinois, Pechous served in the United States Marine Corps during the Korean War. He then received his degree in political science from Southern Illinois University.

Career 
Before entering politics, Pechous worked as a teacher. Pechous was the Berwyn Township supervisor and Berwyn city clerk. He served in the Illinois House of Representatives from 1977 to 1983 as a Democrat. In 1992, he ran unsuccessfully for his old seat.

Death 
Pechous died in Berwyn, Illinois.

Notes

1933 births
2013 deaths
People from Berwyn, Illinois
Southern Illinois University alumni
Educators from Illinois
Democratic Party members of the Illinois House of Representatives
Military personnel from Illinois